Douglas Edward Wright (born 1955 in Goose Bay, Labrador) is a Canadian supernatural suspense / dark fantasy writer of horror fiction who now resides in Victoria, British Columbia, Canada.

Douglas grew up in Labrador, Saskatchewan and Ontario. He started school in Moose Jaw, Saskatchewan, and continued in CFB Borden and Prescott, Ontario.  Having been married once, he has two children, one adopted, Della and his own daughter, Stephanie.

After having worked for Canada Post in several Ontario towns, he moved to Iqaluit, Nunavut, Springdale, Newfoundland, Victoria, Duncan, British Columbia, and Whitehorse, Yukon.  In 2010, after moving back to Victoria, he retired from Canada Post.

His stories have been or will be published in: Britain's Horror Express Magazine, HUB and Thirteen Magazine: USA's Black Ink Horror Magazine, Escaping Elsewhere, Mount Zion Press, Chainsaw Magazine, and in the anthologies 'Raw Meat' by CWW Press, the HELP anthology by the Preditors and Editors website and Larry Sells' 'Enter the Realm.'

Published works
Vampyre's Quest – Papercut Publishing  – 2011/12 – Anthology
Gristle & Bone – Black Ink Horror – Issue 7 – 2010/11
Nickels – Seventh Star Press – 2010 – Anthology
Boogaloos – SideShow Press – 2009 – Novella
Sweet Things –  SideShow Press – 2009 – Chapbook
Prairie Santa – Black Ink Horror – 2009 – Issue 5
Crimson Hearts – The Help Anthology – 2008
Uncommitted – Sideshow Press – Sideshow Press – 2007
Grannies – Black Ink Horror – October 2007 – Issue 3
Hunger – Escaping Elsewhere Magazine – 2007
Scrapyard Dawn – Mount Zion Speculative Fiction Review – 2007
Relative Misery – Black Ink Horror – 2007 – Issue 2
ROH! – Hub Magazine – Issue 2 – Feb. 2007
Hofferdog – Escaping Elsewhere # 3 – May – 2006
The Storyteller –  Chainsaw Magazine – February – 2006
The Glass Cross –  Horror Express # 5 – 2005
Breathing in the Past – SideShow Press – Wicked Karnival – Halloween Edition – 2005
Terror Time – Thirteen Magazine – February 2005
Cassandra's Playground –  Thirteen Magazine – January – 2005
Crimson Hearts – Horror Express # 4 – 2005
Ice Maidens of Rattling Brooke – Horror Express # 3 – 2004
Soul Mates – Larry Sells Publishing – 2004
Douglas is also one of the Submissions Editors for Dark Discoveries Magazine.

References

External links
Douglas E. Wright

Canadian horror writers
Writers from Newfoundland and Labrador
1955 births
Living people
People from Happy Valley-Goose Bay